Jean Hébey (1916–1992) was a French Algerian film actor.

Selected filmography

 Le bébé de l'escadron (1935)
 Bichon (1936) - Jacques Fontanges
 Les grands (1936)
 Counsel for Romance (1936) - Fil-de-fer / Slim
 The Man from Nowhere (1937) - Pomino
 L'accroche-coeur (1938) - (uncredited)
 Remontons les Champs-Élysées (1938) - Louis XVI
 Eusèbe député (1939) - Le maître d'hôtel
 L'entraîneuse (1939) - Un pensionnaire (uncredited)
 Beating Heart (1940) - Ponthus
 The Eleventh Hour Guest (1945) - Frédéric
 La femme fatale (1946) - Le directeur de l'hôtel
 The Queen's Necklace (1946) - Le roi Louis XVI
 The Marriage of Ramuntcho (1947) - L'hôtelier Dugoret
 Naughty Martine (1947) - Le marquis
 Quai des Orfèvres (1947) - L'excentrique (uncredited)
 Une nuit à Tabarin (1947) - Le speaker
 Scandals of Clochemerle (1948) - Un commis
 Emile the African (1949) - Le clerc de notaire
 The Red Shoes (1948) - Parisian Taxi Driver at Opera Square (uncredited)
 Une femme par jour (1949) - Bob
 Manon (1949) - L'hôtelière
 The Chocolate Girl (1949)
 Brilliant Waltz (1949) - Le directeur
 Not Any Weekend for Our Love (1950) - Robert Renfort, directeur du journal
 Manèges (1950) - L'acheteur de chevaux
 We Will All Go to Paris (1950) - Le secrétaire
 Plus de vacances pour le Bon Dieu (1950)
 The Paris Waltz (1950) - Le dîneur
 My Friend Sainfoin (1950) - Le cabaretier
 Quay of Grenelle (1950) - Monsieur Chotard
 Ma pomme (1950) - Le patron du restaurant
 La plus belle fille du monde (1951) - Le directeur du journal France Presse
 Paris Nights (1951) - Le restaurateur
 The Cape of Hope (1951) - M. Flavey
 Chacun son tour (1951) - Barbochon
 Le témoin de minuit (1953) - Filmont - l'éditeur
 Les Compagnes de la nuit (1953) - L'avocat
 Les Intrigantes (1954) - Le Juge d'Instruction (uncredited)
 Flesh and the Woman (1954) - Le commissaire de police
 Crainquebille (1954) - Le bistrot
 Faites-moi confiance (1954) - Kapok
 April Fools' Day (1954) - M. Dutreille
 Oasis (1955) - Fremdenführer
 Papa, maman, ma femme et moi (1955) - Un passant (uncredited)
 Frou-Frou (1955) - L'homme qui veut enlever 'Frou frou
 La rue des bouches peintes (1955) - Le bijoutier
 The Lowest Crime (1955) - Un inspecteur
 To Catch a Thief (1955) - Police Inspector Mercier (uncredited)
 The Little Rebels (1955) - La Cravate
 Marie Antoinette Queen of France (1956) - Marquis de Migennes
 Les carottes sont cuites (1956)
 Que les hommes sont bêtes (1957)
 An Eye for an Eye (1957) - L'automobiliste
 Incognito (1958) - Le directeur du cabaret
 Madame et son auto (1958)
 Suivez-moi jeune homme (1958) - Le bijoutier
 Mimi Pinson (1958)
 Asphalte (1959) - L'homme d'affaires
 Goodbye Again (1961) - Monsieur Cherel - Man in Club (uncredited)
 Alibi pour un meurtre (1961) - Docquois
 Five Miles to Midnight (1962) - Nikandros
 Le grand bidule (1967) - Le ministre
 Ces messieurs de la famille (1968) - Le directeur de Gabriel
 House of Cards (1968) - Man in charge of sleeping cars
 Sapho ou La fureur d'aimer (1971)
 Perched on a Tree (1971) - Le reporter TV
 Le droit d'aimer (1972)

References

Bibliography
 Capua, Michelangelo. Anatole Litvak: The Life and Films. McFarland, 2015.

External links

1916 births
1992 deaths
Algerian male film actors
French male film actors
People from Algiers
Pieds-Noirs
Migrants from French Algeria to France